Shivanapur is a village in Dharwad district of Karnataka, India.

Demographics 
As of the 2011 Census of India there were 138 households in Shivanapur and a total population of 740 consisting of 384 males and 356 females. There were 125 children ages 0-6.

References

Villages in Dharwad district